Polycera anae is a species of sea slug, a nudibranch, a marine gastropod mollusc in the family Polyceridae.

Distribution
This species of polycerid nudibranch was described from Rocas Tiburon off Isla Brincano, Panama, Pacific Ocean. The original description also includes specimens from the Pacific Ocean coast of  Costa Rica. In Mexico and southern California this species is replaced by a similar species, Polycera alabe. Genetic evidence suggests that other species exist in the area, but these have not yet been named.

Description
The body of Polycera anae is mottled brown or black with raised orange spots forming broken lines along the back and sides. There are pale brown conical tubercles along the notal margin. The oral veil has 4 conical papillae which are pale brown and the gills have pale brown tips. The rhinophore clubs are a similar colour. This is a small species, growing to 5 mm in length.

References 

Polyceridae
Gastropods described in 2014